"Walkie Talkie Man" is a song by New Zealand band Steriogram, released in 2004 on the album Schmack! and as a single.

The song is widely recognized as bringing Steriogram the majority of their popularity. Its simple, catchy riff and fast-talking verses contribute to the song's popularity, and it attracted even more attention when it was used as the background music to an advert by Apple for the iPod.

The song debuted at #19 on the UK Singles Chart in the United Kingdom and reached #14 on the New Zealand Singles Chart in the band's native New Zealand.

The riff is almost an exact replica of the one used in "Picture Book" by The Kinks, which was also emulated in "Pretend Best Friend" by Terrorvision, "Warning" by Green Day, and "Big Bang Baby" by Stone Temple Pilots.

Exactly 1:59 into the song, lead guitarist Brad Carter sneezes.

Music video
The music video for "Walkie Talkie Man" was directed by Michel Gondry, and features scenes of children working as studio staff and knitting instruments and equipment, and the band is terrorized by a giant hand made of wool which grabs singer Tyson Kennedy and tears him in half, showing that his insides are also made of wool. The children save him by unraveling the threads that compose the giant and sewing his lower body back in place – but it is sewn backwards and Kennedy ends the video with his legs turned back to the camera, unlike his upper body. Brad Carter's woollen guitar bears the words "New Zealand". The video is available on the DVD compilation Michel Gondry 2: More Videos (Before and After DVD 1). The music video was nominated for a Grammy Award for Best Short Form Music Video in 2005 and four Video Music Awards.

Use in media 
The song was used in the films Robots, Kicking & Screaming and Agent Cody Banks 2: Destination London, as well as the video games MVP Baseball 2004, MLB 2005, and Elite Beat Agents.

'Kicking & Screaming

Personnel
 Tyson Kennedy – lead vocals
 Brad Carter – co-lead vocals and lead guitar
 Tim Youngson – rhythm guitar and backing vocals
 Jake Adams – bass guitar and backing vocals
 Jared Wrennall – drums and backing vocals

Charts

References

2004 singles
2004 songs
Animated music videos
Capitol Records singles
Music videos directed by Michel Gondry
New Zealand songs
Song recordings produced by David Kahne
Steriogram songs
Stop-motion animated music videos